John Maddox Roberts is an American author of science fiction, fantasy, and historical fiction including the SPQR series and Hannibal's Children.

Personal life
John Maddox Roberts was born in Ohio and was raised in Texas, California, and New Mexico. He has lived in various places in the United States as well as in Scotland, England and Mexico. He was kicked out of college in 1967 and joined the Army. He was in the US Army 1967–70, and did a tour in Vietnam. After he returned, he became a Green Beret.

He lives with his wife in Estancia, New Mexico.

Career
Upon his return to civilian life, Roberts decided to be a writer and sold his first book to Doubleday in 1975; his book was published in 1977 as The Strayed Sheep of Charum. His earlier books were in the science fiction, fantasy and historical genres.

In 1989, Roberts published his first historical mystery, The King's Gambit, set in ancient Rome. The book was nominated for the Edgar Award as best mystery of the year. The book was first in Maddox's SPQR series of mysteries.

Roberts also wrote a series of contemporary detective novels about a private eye named Gabe Treloar. The first book, A Typical American Town, is set in a fictionalized version of that Ohio town where he was born. The second, The Ghosts of Saigon, used his experiences in Vietnam. The third, Desperate Highways, is a road novel.

When asked by TSR to do a Dragonlance mystery, he wrote Murder in Tarsis. Roberts wrote an unpublished science fiction book called The Line, a police procedural set in a near-future Los Angeles where the biggest racket is illegal traffic in fetal pineal glands.

Bibliography

Cingulum series
The Cingulum (1985)
Cloak of Illusion (1985)
The Sword, The Jewel, and The Mirror (1988)

Island Worlds series
Act of God (1985) (with Eric Kotani)
The Island Worlds (1987) (with Eric Kotani)
Between The Stars (1988) (with Eric Kotani)
Delta Pavonis (1990) (with Eric Kotani)

Conan series
Conan the Valorous (1985)
Conan the Champion (1987)
Conan the Marauder (1988)
Conan the Bold (1989)
Conan the Rogue (1991)
Conan and the Manhunters (1994)
Conan and the Treasure of Python (1994)
Conan and the Amazon (1995)

Dragonlance series
Murder in Tarsis (1996)

Falcon Series
An action series telling the story of a Crusader returning to Europe to seek vengeance on his father's killers (each written under the pen name of Mark Ramsay)
The Falcon Strikes
The Black Pope
The Bloody Cross (1982)
The King's Treasure (1983)

Gabe Treloar series
A Typical American Town (1994)
Ghosts of Saigon (1996)
Desperate Highways (1997)

Space Angel series
Space Angel (1979)
Spacer: Window of the Mind (1988)

SPQR series
Mystery series set in Ancient Rome
SPQR (1990) (also SPQR I: The King's Gambit)
The Catiline Conspiracy (1991)
The Sacrilege (1992)
The Temple of the Muses (1999)
Saturnalia (1999)
Nobody Loves A Centurion (2001)
The Tribune's Curse (2003)
The River God's Vengeance (2004)
The Princess and the Pirates (2005)
A Point of Law (2006)
Under Vesuvius (2007)
Oracle of the Dead (December 9, 2008)
The Year of Confusion (February 16, 2010)

Stormlands series
The Islander  (1990)
The Black Shields (1991)
The Poisoned Lands (1992)
The Steel Kings (1993)
Queens of Land and Sea  (1994)

Hannibal series
Hannibal's Children (2002)
The Seven Hills (2005)

Individual novels
The Strayed Sheep of Charun (1977), expanded into Cestus Dei (1983)
King of the Wood (1983)
The Enigma Variations (1989)
Legacy of Prometheus (2000)
Total Recall 2070: Machine Dreams (2000)

Short stories 

 "Mightier Than the Sword" (1993, SPQR series), in the historical mystery anthology The Mammoth Book of Historical Whodunnits, edited by Mike Ashley
 "The King of Sacrifices",  (1993, SPQR series), in the historical mystery anthology The Mammoth Book of Historical Detectives, edited by Mike Ashley
 "The Statuette of Rhodes" (1996, SPQR series), in the historical mystery anthology Classical Whodunits: Murder and Mystery from Ancient Greece and Rome, edited by Mike Ashley
 "The Mountain Wolves" (1996, not in series) in the anthology Classical Stories: Heroic Tales from Ancient Greece and Rome, edited by Mike Ashley
 "The Etruscan House"  (1998, SPQR series), in the historical mystery anthology Crime Through Time II, edited by Miriam Grace Monfredo and Sharon Newman
 "An Academic Question" (1998, SPQR series), in the historical mystery anthology Past Poisons: An Ellis Peters Memorial Anthology of Historical Crime, edited by Maxim Jakubowski
 "Venus in Pearls" (2001, SPQR series), in Alfred Hitchcock's Mystery Magazine, July–August 2001 
 "The Will" (2003, SPQR series), in the historical mystery anthology The Mammoth Book of Roman Whodunnits, edited by Mike Ashley
 "Beware the Snake" (2011, SPQR series), in the urban fantasy anthology Down These Strange Streets, edited by George R. R. Martin and Gardner Dozois

References

External links
 

20th-century American male writers
20th-century American novelists
21st-century American male writers
21st-century American novelists
American alternate history writers
American fantasy writers
American male novelists
American science fiction writers
Conan the Barbarian novelists
Living people
Members of the United States Army Special Forces
People from Torrance County, New Mexico
United States Army personnel of the Vietnam War
United States Army soldiers
Writers of historical fiction set in antiquity
Writers of historical mysteries
Year of birth missing (living people)